Non-cirrhotic portal fibrosis (NCPF) is a chronic liver disease and type of non-cirrhotic portal hypertension (NCPH).

Presentation
It is characterized by 'obliterative portovenopathy', which leads to various problems such as portal hypertension, massive splenomegaly, and variceal bleeding. It is estimated that about 85% of people with NCPF have repeated episodes of variceal bleeding.

Diagnosis
Hallmark of the disease is thrombosis/sclerosis of branches of portal vein. Vessels formed are often termed as mesangiosinusoids or periportal cavernoma.

Treatment

References

External links 

Diseases of liver